Not Your Typical Bigfoot Movie is a 2008 American documentary film about Dallas Gilbert and Wayne Burton, two Bigfoot researchers from Portsmouth, Ohio.  The documentary was directed by Jay Delaney.

Release
The film was released at the Pioneer Theater in New York on October 17, 2008.

Reception
The film has an 80% rating on Rotten Tomatoes.  Ed Gonzalez of Slant Magazine awarded the film two stars out of four.  Mel Valentin of Slash Film gave it a 6 out of 10.

References

External links
 
 
 

American documentary films
2008 films
2008 documentary films
Bigfoot films
2000s English-language films
2000s American films